This article features the 2003 UEFA European Under-19 Championship first qualifying round. 22 teams (11 group winners and runners-up) qualified for the second qualifying round.

Byes
The following teams received a bye for this round:
 
 
 
  (main tournament host)

Group 1

All matches were played in Lithuania.

{| cellspacing=1 width=70%
!width=25%| !!width=30%| !!width=15%| !!width=30%|
|-
|
|align=right|
|align=center|4–1
|
|-
|
|align=right|
|align=center|1–3
|
|-
|
|align=right|
|align=center|3–1
|
|-
|
|align=right|
|align=center|1–2
|
|-
|
|align=right|
|align=center|1–2
|
|-
|
|align=right|
|align=center|0–5
|

Group 2

All matches were played in Sweden.

{| cellspacing=1 width=70%
!width=25%| !!width=30%| !!width=15%| !!width=30%|
|-
|
|align=right|
|align=center|1–0
|
|-
|
|align=right|
|align=center|0–0
|
|-
|
|align=right|
|align=center|1–2
|
|-
|
|align=right|
|align=center|0–0
|
|-
|
|align=right|
|align=center|0–1
|
|-
|
|align=right|
|align=center|2–3
|

Group 3

All matches were played in England.

{| cellspacing=1 width=70%
!width=25%| !!width=30%| !!width=15%| !!width=30%|
|-
|
|align=right|
|align=center|6–2
|
|-
|
|align=right|
|align=center|0–3
|
|-
|
|align=right|
|align=center|0–4
|
|-
|
|align=right|
|align=center|0–9
|
|-
|
|align=right|
|align=center|4–0
|
|-
|
|align=right|
|align=center|1–2
|

Group 4

All matches were played in Latvia.

{| cellspacing=1 width=70%
!width=25%| !!width=30%| !!width=15%| !!width=30%|
|-
|
|align=right|
|align=center|1–1
|
|-
|
|align=right|
|align=center|1–1
|
|-
|
|align=right|
|align=center|0–2
|
|-
|
|align=right|
|align=center|0–4
|
|-
|
|align=right|
|align=center|3–0
|
|-
|
|align=right|
|align=center|2–0
|

Group 5

All matches were played in Germany.

{| cellspacing=1 width=70%
!width=25%| !!width=30%| !!width=15%| !!width=30%|
|-
|
|align=right|
|align=center|4–0
|
|-
|
|align=right|
|align=center|0–10
|
|-
|
|align=right|
|align=center|0–7
|
|-
|
|align=right|
|align=center|4–0
|
|-
|
|align=right|
|align=center|4–1
|
|-
|
|align=right|
|align=center|3–0
|

Group 6

All matches were played in Switzerland.

{| cellspacing=1 width=70%
!width=25%| !!width=30%| !!width=15%| !!width=30%|
|-
|
|align=right|
|align=center|1–4
|
|-
|
|align=right|
|align=center|3–1
|
|-
|
|align=right|
|align=center|0–2
|
|-
|
|align=right|
|align=center|5–0
|
|-
|
|align=right|
|align=center|1–0
|
|-
|
|align=right|
|align=center|3–1
|

Group 7

All matches were played in Cyprus.

{| cellspacing=1 width=70%
!width=25%| !!width=30%| !!width=15%| !!width=30%|
|-
|
|align=right|
|align=center|2–0
|
|-
|
|align=right|
|align=center|3–1
|
|-
|
|align=right|
|align=center|0–1
|
|-
|
|align=right|
|align=center|2–2
|
|-
|
|align=right|
|align=center|2–6
|
|-
|
|align=right|
|align=center|0–2
|

Group 8

All matches were played in Georgia.

{| cellspacing=1 width=70%
!width=25%| !!width=30%| !!width=15%| !!width=30%|
|-
|
|align=right|
|align=center|1–0
|
|-
|
|align=right|
|align=center|0–6
|
|-
|
|align=right|
|align=center|2–0
|
|-
|
|align=right|
|align=center|2–0
|
|-
|
|align=right|
|align=center|2–1
|
|-
|
|align=right|
|align=center|2–0
|

Group 9

All matches were played in Russia.

{| cellspacing=1 width=70%
!width=25%| !!width=30%| !!width=15%| !!width=30%|
|-
|
|align=right|
|align=center|4–0
|
|-
|
|align=right|
|align=center|0–5
|
|-
|
|align=right|
|align=center|9–0
|
|-
|
|align=right|
|align=center|0–3
|
|-
|
|align=right|
|align=center|0–1
|
|-
|
|align=right|
|align=center|2–1
|

Group 10

All matches were played in Slovenia.

{| cellspacing=1 width=70%
!width=25%| !!width=30%| !!width=15%| !!width=30%|
|-
|
|align=right|
|align=center|3–1
|
|-
|
|align=right|
|align=center|1–2
|
|-
|
|align=right|
|align=center|1–4
|
|-
|
|align=right|
|align=center|1–2
|
|-
|
|align=right|
|align=center|1–4
|
|-
|
|align=right|
|align=center|1–2
|

Group 11

All matches were played in Northern Ireland.

{| cellspacing=1 width=70%
!width=25%| !!width=30%| !!width=15%| !!width=30%|
|-
|
|align=right|
|align=center|4–0
|
|-
|
|align=right|
|align=center|0–5
|
|-
|
|align=right|
|align=center|4–0
|
|-
|
|align=right|
|align=center|0–4
|
|-
|
|align=right|
|align=center|2–1
|
|-
|
|align=right|
|align=center|0–2
|

See also
 2003 UEFA European Under-19 Championship second qualifying round
 2003 UEFA European Under-19 Championship

External links
Results by RSSSF

1
UEFA European Under-19 Championship qualification